Francisco Inestroza was President of Honduras 31 December 1863 - 15 February 1864.

He served as Vice President of Honduras in the cabinet of José María Medina from June 1863 to December 1863.

References 

1810 births
Year of death missing
Presidents of Honduras
Vice presidents of Honduras